Charlie McNeill may refer to:
 Charlie McNeill (bowls), Australian lawn bowls player
 Charlie McNeill (footballer), English footballer

See also
 Charles McNeil (disambiguation)